Tojinium is a monotypic genus of Japanese sheet weavers containing the single species, Tojinium japonicum. It was first described by H. Saito & H. Ono in 2001, and is only found in Japan.

See also
 List of Linyphiidae species (Q–Z)

References

Linyphiidae
Monotypic Araneomorphae genera
Spiders of Asia